Ana Lima  (born ) is a retired Brazilian female volleyball player. She was part of the Brazil women's national volleyball team.

She participated in the 1994 FIVB Volleyball Women's World Championship. On club level she played with Colgate/Sao Caetano.

Clubs
 Colgate/Sao Caetano (1994)

References

1969 births
Living people
Brazilian women's volleyball players
Place of birth missing (living people)
Sportspeople from Alagoas
21st-century Brazilian women